Agonum ferruginosum is a species of ground beetle from Platyninae subfamily. It was described by Dejean in 1828 and is endemic to the United States.

References

External links
Agonum ferruginosum on Bug Guide

Beetles described in 1828
ferruginosum
Endemic fauna of the United States
Beetles of North America